Old Årdal Church is a historic parish church of the Church of Norway in Hjelmeland Municipality in Rogaland county, Norway. It is located in the village of Årdal. It used to be the church for the Årdal parish (but now it is rarely used) which is part of the Ryfylke prosti (deanery) in the Diocese of Stavanger. The red, wooden church was built in a long church design in 1620 using designs by an unknown architect. The church seats about 175 people.

History
The earliest existing historical records of the church date back to the year 1308, but the stave church was likely built during the 13th century. The church was torn down in 1619 and a new church was built on the same site. The new church was consecrated in 1620. The new building was constructed using some of the reused materials from the previous church on the same general site. Part of the foundation under the southwest corner of the church was the same foundation for the medieval stave church.

Since that time, the old church has no longer been used regularly, but it has been used for special occasions such as weddings and concerts. There are still two regularly scheduled worship services held at the church each year, one service on Olsok and one other Sunday morning in the summer. The interior of the church is decorated with hand-painted rosemåling.

Media gallery

See also
List of churches in Rogaland

References

Hjelmeland
Churches in Rogaland
Wooden churches in Norway
17th-century Church of Norway church buildings
Churches completed in 1620
13th-century establishments in Norway